Verlag Herder is a publishing company started by the Herders, a German family. The company focuses primarily on Catholic topics of ecclesiology, Christian mysticism, women's studies, and the development of younger Catholic theologians.

History

Bartholomäus Herder
In 1801 Bartholomäus Herder founded the publishing firm in Meersburg. Among the first publications, which were mainly of a theological and pedagogic character, were Wessenberg's "Archiv für pastorale Conferenzen in den Landkapiteln des Bisthums Constanz" (1802–27).

In 1810 the business moved to Freiburg im Breisgau, where, in connection with the university, a more comprehensive character was given to the publications and helped in developing new directions. One of the most important publications was Karl von Rotteck's "Allgemeine Geschichte vom Anfang der historischen Kenntniss bis auf unsere Zeiten" (9 volumes, 1812–27; the 15th edition being issued by another firm), which for more than a generation was "the gospel of the educated liberal middle classes". Being entrusted with the publication of the official war bulletin, the "Teutsche Blätter", by the royal and imperial authorities at headquarters as early as the end of 1813, Herder went to Paris with the allied armies in 1815 in Metternich's train as "Director of the Royal and Imperial Field Press".

Subsequent to the conclusion of peace Herder founded an art institution for lithography, copperplate engraving, and modeling in terra cotta, in connection with the publishing business. In the course of time upwards of three hundred pupils were turned out from this institution, while the sumptuous illustrations and maps that were issued mark an epoch in the history of this branch of technic–especially the "Heilige Schriften des Alten und Neuen Testamentes in 200 biblischen Kupfern" (the Holy Writ of the Old and the New Testament in 200 biblical engravings), of which Herder reproduced numerous impressions by an original lithographic process, and Woerl's "Atlas von Central-Europa in 60 Blättern" (Atlas of Central Europe in 60 plates, 1830), which was the earliest employment of two-colour lithography. As late as 1870 this atlas rendered important service to the German army by reason of the map of France it contained. Although such great achievements won a European reputation for the house, the commercial profits derived therefrom were entirely disproportionate to the expenditure. Consequently the condition of the house at Bartholomäus Herder's death in 1839 was by no means a satisfactory one. His two sons succeeded to the heritage.

Karl Raphael Herder and Benjamin Herder
Karl Raphael Herder (2 November 1816 – 10 June 1865), the older son of Bartholomäus, took up the commercial side of the business, while the younger Benjamin Herder (31 July 1818 – 10 November 1888), took charge of the publishing department until his brother's retirement in 1856, when he undertook the sole management. Equipped with a thorough, scholarly education, trained in the book business by his father and under Gauthier de Laguionie in Paris, Benjamin had had his views further broadened early in life by travels through Germany, Austria, France, England, and Italy.

Of a character earnest and religious, he was strongly impressed by the Cologne troubles of 1837, and, as in the case of so many of his contemporaries, they gave a direction to his life, and this youth of twenty-one set to work with the definite aim of taking his part in the liberation and revival of the Catholic Church in Germany. First of all he gradually abandoned fine-art publications in favour of book-publishing, being thus enabled to devote the full measure of his energies to the service of religious learning. Herein he displayed such activity in the encouragement of particular branches of erudition that the history of his theological publications, for instance, would comprise a considerable fragment of the history of modern theological literature, and the catechetical branch thereof would constitute one of the most important divisions of the history of catechetics. After theology Herder applied himself with the greatest zest to pedagogies, to the lives and learning of the saints as well as to other edifying biographies; also after a long and cautious delay to the publication of sermons. He next took up works dealing with the religious and political problems of the day, with questions of ecclesiastical policy and social controversies and issues. Finally, passing beyond the limits which previously Catholic literature had seldom ventured to transcend, he began the publication of works on the general sciences–history and philosophy, the natural sciences, geography, and ethnology, including the publication of atlases, school textbooks, music, art and its literature, the history of literature, and belles-lettres. His governing purpose throughout was to avoid wasting his energies on particular publications, but to build up the various branches gradually and systematically by the publication of more comprehensive "collections" and "libraries" and by the issue of scientific periodicals.

The Kirchenlexikon (Church Lexicon) was the great centre of his fifty years' activity as a publisher. It was the first comprehensive attempt to treat everything that had any connexion with theology encyclopedically in one work, and also the first attempt to unite all the Catholic savants of Germany, in the production of one great work. Herder had nursed this project since 1840. When its appearance was made possible and its issue was begun in 1847 under the direction of Benedict Welte, exegete of Tübingen, and Heinrich Joseph Wetzer, Orientalist of Freiburg. After sixteen years of struggling and striving on the part of Herder, all obstacles were overcome, and the work was brought to completion in 1856, thanks chiefly to the support of Hefele.

It had a decisive influence on the subsequent intellectual activity of Catholicism. While it was still in process of issue, Protestant scholars made use of Herder's scheme for the Real-Encyklopädie für protestantische Theologie. It was sixteen years more before the preliminary work could be begun on the new edition, and ten years more before its publication could be started.

While the historical element had been especially emphasized in the first edition, the dogmatic and exegetical side was expanded to equal dimensions in the second edition. The subjects to be treated were chosen by Adalbert Weiss, professor at the Freising lyceum, and the editorial chair was held by Joseph Hergenröther until his elevation to the cardinalate, and afterwards by Franz Philip Kaulen, the exegete of Bonn.

The stupendous plan, which Benjamin had cherished since 1841, of building up a "Theologische Bibliothek" (Theological Library) according to an equally logical and symmetrical scheme, he was unable to realize until thirty years later. When the "Kirchenlexikon" was nearing completion, Herder sought, by the publication of the "Konversations-Lexikon" (Universal Encyclopedia, 1st ed., 1853-7), to make the Catholic public independent of the hostile literature which ruled unchallenged in the highly important domain of works of general information. Although, out of regard for the limited purchasing capacity of the Catholic public in Germany, he confined himself to the modest limits of five medium-sized volumes, still the undertaking was for his day a very courageous one. Of the very great number of other works published by him, we can draw attention only to the most notable, which spread the reputation of the house far beyond the limits of Germany. Among the earliest were the works of Alban Stolz, popular theologian and teacher, whose Kalender für Zeit und Ewigkeit achieved an extraordinary success. Alongside Stolz we find Ignaz Schuster, whose catechisms and Biblical histories, went round the world, like Stolz's works, in hundreds of thousands of copies, and up to twenty-five languages.

Even before the completion of the "Kirchenlexikon" Hefele began his monumental "Conciliengeschichte". The strong religious revival that set in with the sixties was heralded by Franz Hettinger's pioneer work, the Apologie des Christentums, which set forth the religious teachings of Christianity to the cultured world in well-timed fashion, and which, reprinted again and again, and constantly improved, continues to exercise a potent influence in five foreign civilized languages even to this day. The "Apologien" of Weiss and Schanz were subsequently issued to support and supplement Hettinger's "Apologie". Of these works the one contrasts Christian life and its historical and cultural development with a purely worldly knowledge and the outlook of the age, while the other strives to harmonize the doctrines of the Church and the results of scientific research.

The Encyclicals of December 1864, and the question of infallibility called forth in the pages of the "Stimmen aus Maria Laach" the comprehensive defence of the authority of the pope, as pastor and teacher, while the controversies concerning the Vatican Council occasioned Hergenröther's masterly "Anti-Janus", afterwards expanded and strengthened in the almost inexhaustible historico-theological essays, the "Katholische Kirche und christlicher Staat in ihrer geschichtlichen Entwicklung und in Beziehung auf Fragen der Gegenwart". The "Stimmen", which at first appeared irregularly, inaugurated those relations between the house of Herder and the German Jesuits which have proved of so great importance to Catholic learning and Catholic life, and have kept the Jesuits in such close touch with their native country even while they were in exile during the persecution of the Kulturkampf. Of the abundant fruits of these relations we may mention the great "Collectio Lacensis" of the more recent councils, which displays a Benedictine industry in the collection of materials, and the "Philosophia Lacensis", nor can we forget the vigorous "Stimmen", which rapidly developed into the organ of the current intellectual movement, and its thoroughly stimulating and very instructive "Ergänzungshefte" (Supplementary Numbers), which already number more than one hundred. After the promulgation of the fundamental decrees of the Vatican Council, the Theologische Bibliothek was opened with Scheeben's Handbuch der Dogmatik.

While the Kulturkampf was threatening to silence the expression of Catholic life, Janssen's Geschichte des deutschen Volkes began its triumphant course, and carried, for the first time, Catholic research into wide Protestant circles. The last ten years of Herder's existence crowned his life-work. Quite apart from the individual volumes of the various Collections and of the Apologies already mentioned, he produced, among other works, the "Real-Encyklopädie der christlichen Alterthümer" by F. X. Kraus, the new edition of the "Kirchenlexikon", Knecht's "Praktischer Kommentar zur biblischen Geschichte", the "Bibliothek für Länder- und Völker-kunde", the "Jahrbuch der Naturwissenschaften", Pastor's "Geschichte der Päpste", the "Staatslexikon der Görres-Gesellschaft", the "Archiv für Literature und Kirchengeschichte des Mittelalters" by Denifle and Ehrle, and the "Bibliothek für katholische Pädagogik".

Thus Benjamin Herder's activity as a publisher was always a faithful mirror of the Catholic revival in Germany in the nineteenth century, and furthermore a powerful lever exerted in favour of the Catholic cause. This was so much the more creditable, since Herder was not merely the agent, but also in general the originator of his enterprises. Possessing a clear and profound knowledge of the needs of Catholic literature, it was usually he who selected the themes for literary treatment. When he once recognized a project to be right, he clung to it tenaciously until conditions proved favourable, although decades elapsed before his scheme could be realized. Almost always on the watch for competent collaborators, he discovered the majority by his own exertions, personal acquaintance usually developing into lifelong friendship. In no undertaking did he allow material gain to be the deciding factor; even in times of crisis–and of such he encountered more than one, beginning with the Baden uprising of 1848, right through the wars which raged between 1859 and 1871, down to the dreary years of the Kulturkampf which crippled the resources of both clergy and people–the end in view alone determined his decision. Thoroughly alive to his grave responsibility as a publisher, he devoted extraordinary care to the training of capable and conscientious assistants. His partner, Franz Joseph Hutter (b. at Ravensburg, 25 November 1840) issued from the ranks of these "pupils". His essentially practical nature happily complemented Benjamin's idealism, which even repeated warnings had not been able to shake. New branches were established to open a wider market than the older establishments at Freiburg and Strasburg afforded. In 1873 were founded the St. Louis (U. S. A.) branch, under the management of Joseph Gummersbach, and the Munich branch under Herder's brother-in-law, Adolf Streber, and in 1886 that at Vienna, while enterprises of even greater promise were contemplated. In 1863 Herder married Emilie Streber, the accomplished daughter of Franz Seraph Streber, professor at the Munich University, and celebrated as a numismatist. His alliance with the Streber family introduced Herder to a circle of men who played an important part in the Catholic revival in Germany. It was also contemporaneous with a more active movement in the Church, in which Herder took a notable part. Though handicapped throughout by great physical sufferings, he bore all to the end without complaining, striving unceasingly onwards and upwards.

Hermann Herder 
Under the management of Hermann Herder, a series of collections, chiefly theological and historical, were issued.  Publishing started in foreign languages, principally Spanish and English. In the 21st century, various annuals have been published. These include the "Geschichte der Weltliteratur" of Alexander Baumgartner, the definitive collection of sources for the Tridentine Council, the third, completely revised, edition of the "Konversations-Lexikon", and Joseph Wilpert's work, Fractio Panis, die alteste Darstellung der eucharistischen Opfers (Freiburg in Breisgau) on the catacombs.

In 1906 a branch of the firm was established at Berlin. The firm also established an office in St. Louis, Missouri. In this location, the firm continued to be a source of Catholic catechetical and scholastical work.

Virtually every work ever published by Karl Rahner was introduced by Herder.  The Freiburg branch was the original publisher for several works by Joseph Cardinal Ratzinger (now Pope Benedict XVI).

Current operations
In the 1990s, the American imprint of Herder & Herder was brought back under the international Herder publishing family. Gwendolin Herder became the CEO of The Crossroad Publishing Company, based in New York. Manuel Herder was in charge of operations in Freiburg, Germany, and Raimund Herder led the office in Barcelona, Spain.

References

External links

 

German publishers (people)
Book publishing companies of Germany
Publishing companies established in 1801
Christian publishing companies
German companies established in 1801